The Army Air Force Technician Badge was an award of the United States Army Air Forces which was first created in 1941.  Similar in design to the Weapons Qualification Badge, the Army Air Force Technician Badge was awarded to denote special training and qualifications held by members of the Army Air Force.

The Army Air Force Technician Badge appeared as a wreathed propeller from which qualification bars were suspended that denoted the training and qualifications held by the wearer.  27 bars were authorized to the Army Air Force Technician Badge, including:

 AP ARMORER (Aircraft armory specialists)
 LINK TRAINER INST (Ground school training personnel)
 T RET & SIGHT SP (Weapons calibration and systems experts)
 TELETYPE MECH (Teletype Mechanic)
 WX FORECASTER (Meteorologists and weather forecasters)

With the creation of the United States Air Force in 1947, the Army Air Force Technician Badge was renamed as the Air Force Technician Badge and was authorized for wear into the 1960s.  There were no Air Force Technician Badges issued after the Korean War, however, and by the 1970s the badge was considered obsolete.

External links
 U.S. Army Air Force - Technical & Qualification Badges Private site displaying 26 of the 27 authorized bars

See also
 Military badges of the United States
 Obsolete badges of the United States military

Awards and decorations of the United States Army Air Forces